Coulthurst is a surname. Notable people with the surname include:

Henry William Coulthurst (1753–1817), English Anglican priest and academic
Josiah Coulthurst (1893–1970), English cricketer
Sarah Coulthurst, molecular bacteriologist